Véronique Louwagie (born 20 March 1961) is a French politician of The Republicans (LR) who has been representing Orne's 2nd constituency in the National Assembly since the 2012 election.

Political career
In parliament, Louwagie serves on the Committee on Finance and Budgetary Affairs. In this capacity, she is the parliament's rapporteur on the health budget. In addition to her committee assignments, she is a member of the French-Turkish Parliamentary Friendship Group.

Since the 2017 elections, Louwagie has been serving as one of the eleven deputy chairpersons of the Republicans' parliamentary group, under the leadership of chairman Christian Jacob.

Following Jacob's election as LR chairman, Louwagie announced her candidacy to succeed him as leader of the party's parliamentary group. In an internal vote in November 2019, she eventually came in fifth out of six candidates; the position went to Damien Abad instead.

Political positions
In the Republicans’ 2016 presidential primaries, Louwagie endorsed François Fillon as the party's candidate for the office of President of France. In the Republicans’ 2017 leadership election, she endorsed Laurent Wauquiez. In 2018, Wauquiez included her in his shadow cabinet.

In July 2019, Louwagie voted against the French ratification of the European Union’s Comprehensive Economic and Trade Agreement (CETA) with Canada.

Other activities
 Caisse d'amortissement de la dette sociale (CADES), Member of the Supervisory Board

References

External links 
 Biography at the National Assembly
 Official Website

1961 births
Living people
The Republicans (France) politicians
Politicians from Normandy
People from Eure
People from Orne
21st-century French women politicians
Women members of the National Assembly (France)
Deputies of the 14th National Assembly of the French Fifth Republic
Deputies of the 15th National Assembly of the French Fifth Republic
Members of Parliament for Orne